The men's heavyweight (+87 kilograms) event at the 2010 Asian Games took place on 18 November 2010 at Guangdong Gymnasium, Guangzhou, China.

A total of 11 men from 11 different countries competed in this event, limited to fighters whose body weight was more than 87 kilograms. 

Heo Jun-nyung of South Korea won the gold medal after beating Zheng Yi of China in gold medal match 11–4, The bronze medal was shared by Arman Chilmanov of Kazakhstan and Akmal Irgashev from Uzbekistan.

Schedule
All times are China Standard Time (UTC+08:00)

Results 
Legend
W — Won by withdrawal

References

Results

External links
Official website

Taekwondo at the 2010 Asian Games